Aphelia albociliana is a species of moth of the family Tortricidae. It is found in Russia.

The wingspan is 14–20 mm. Adults have been recorded on wing from May to June.

References

Moths described in 1851
Aphelia (moth)
Moths of Asia
Moths of Europe